Evilastus Kaaronda is a Namibian trade unionist. He served as the secretary general of the National Union of Namibian Workers (NUNW). In April 2011, an investigation against Kaaronda was launched following allegations of misconduct; specifically, Kaaronda was alleged to have made unauthorized public statements which discredited NUNW-affiliated unions.

Kaaronda is considered a new breed of unionist, that more than compromising workers' interest to be politically complacent with the power structures, maintains an outspoken approach on the many polemic issues that affect the workers. His criticisms include support on a people-oriented Basic Income Grant, skepticism on the precarious short-term labour contracts proposed by the TIPEEG program, demands to hold accountable those who were responsible for the N$600 million Government Institutions Pension Fund (GIPF) lost through botched investments in a series of politically connected start-ups, and ultimately to improve the status of the workers rather than decrease them as incentive for foreign investment.

In 2012, Kaaronda was fired from  NUNW alongside its president Elias Manga, citing "gross non-compliance with regard to his duties and responsibilities", the "disunity, division and mistrust" on his part. They were replaced by Connie Pandeni and Alfred Angula.

In 2014, Kaaronda was instrumental in founding the Namibia National Labour Organisation (NANLO).

References

Year of birth missing (living people)
Living people
Namibian trade unionists
Namibian activists